Varaqa (also Romanized as Varaqā and Varqā) is a village in Qarah Kahriz Rural District, Qarah Kahriz District, Shazand County, Markazi Province, Iran. At the 2006 census, its population was 213, in 61 families.

References 

Populated places in Shazand County